Sherardising is a process of galvanization of ferrous metal surfaces, also called vapour galvanising and dry galvanizing. The process is named after British metallurgist Sherard Osborn Cowper-Coles (son of naval inventor Cowper Phipps Coles) who invented and patented the method c. 1900. This process involves heating the steel parts up to c. 500 °C in a closed rotating drum that contains metallic zinc dust and possibly an inert filler, such as sand. At temperatures above 300 °C, zinc evaporates and diffuses into the steel substrate forming diffusion bonded Zn-Fe-phases.

Sherardising is ideal for small parts and parts that require coating of inner surfaces, such as batches of small items. Part size is limited by drum size. It is reported that pipes up to 6 m in length for the oil industry are sherardised. If the metal surface is free of scale or oxides, no pretreatment is needed. The process is hydrogen-free, hence hydrogen embrittlement is prevented.

Application 
During and shortly after World War I, German 5 pfennig and 10 pfennig coins were sherardised.

Standard 
BS EN 13811: 2003 (withdrawn replaced by BS EN ISO 17668:2016)
Sherardizing. Zinc diffusion coatings on ferrous products. Specification

BS EN ISO 14713-3: 2017
Zinc coatings. Guidelines and recommendations for the protection against corrosion of iron and steel in structures. Part 3. Sherardizing

See also 
 Hot-dip galvanization
 Corrugated galvanised iron

References

Chemical processes
Corrosion prevention
Metal plating
Zinc

sk:Zinkovanie